Deep eutectic solvents or DESs are solutions of Lewis or Brønsted acids and bases which form a eutectic mixture. Deep eutectic solvents are highly tunable through varying the structure or relative ratio of parent components and thus have a wide variety of potential applications including catalytic, separation, and electrochemical processes. The parent components of deep eutectic solvents engage in a complex hydrogen bonding network which results in significant freezing point depression as compared to the parent compounds. The extent of freezing point depression observed in DESs is well illustrated by a mixture of choline chloride and urea in a 1:2 mole ratio. Choline chloride and urea are both solids at room temperature with melting points of 302°C (decomposition point) and 133°C respectively, yet the combination of the two in a 1:2 molar ratio forms a liquid with a freezing point of 12°C. DESs share similar properties to ionic liquids such as tunability and lack of flammability yet are distinct in that ionic liquids are neat salts composed exclusively of discrete ions. In contrast to ordinary solvents, such as Volatile Organic Compounds (VOC), DESs are non-flammable, and possess low vapour pressures and toxicity. 

The first generation eutectic solvents were based on mixtures of quaternary ammonium salts with hydrogen bond donors such as amines and carboxylic acids. DESs are classified into four types based on composition:

Type I eutectics include a wide range of chlorometallate ionic solvents which were widely studied in the 1980s, such as imidazolium chloroaluminates which are based on mixtures of AlCl3 + 1-Ethyl-3-methylimidazolium chloride. Type II eutectics are identical to Type I eutectic in composition yet include the hydrated from of the metal halide. Type III eutectics consist of hydrogen bond acceptors such as quaternary ammonium salts (e.g. choline chloride) and hydrogen bond donors (e.g urea, ethylene glycol) and include the class of metal-free deep eutectic solvents. Type III eutectics have been successfully used in metal processing applications such as electrodeposition, electropolishing, and metal extraction. Type IV eutectics are similar to type III yet replace the quaternary ammonium salt hydrogen bond acceptor with a metal halide hydrogen bond acceptor while still using an organic hydrogen bond donor such as urea. Type IV eutectics are of interest for electrodeposition as they produce cationic metal complexes, ensuring that the double layer close to the electrode surface has a high metal ion concentration.

Wide spread practical use of DESs in industrial process or devices has thus far been hindered by relatively high viscosities and low ionic conductivities. Additionally, lack of understanding of the relationship between parent compound structure and solvent function has prevented development of general design rules. Work to understand structure-function relation is on-going.

Natural deep eutectic solvents 
Natural deep eutectic solvents (NADES) are bio-based deep eutectic solvents which are composed of two or more compounds that are generally plant based primary metabolites, i.e. organic acids, sugars, alcohols, amines and amino acids. Work done by Choi, Spronsen et al. showed that water can be present as part of the solvent, being strongly retained in the liquid and which cannot be evaporated.

Research
Compared to modern ionic liquids based on discrete anions, such as bistriflimide, which share many characteristics but are ionic compounds and not ionic mixtures, DES are cheaper to make and sometimes biodegradable. Therefore, DES can be used as safe, efficient, simple, and low–cost solvents.

To date, there are numerous applications that have been studied for DES. By varying the components of the DES and their molar ratios, new DES can be produced. For this reason, many new applications are presented in the literature every year. Some of the earliest applications of DES were the electrofinishing of metals using DES as electrolytes. Organic compounds such as benzoic acid (solubility  0.82 mol/L) have great solubility in DES, and this even includes cellulose.  For this reason, DES were applied as extraction solvents for such material from their complex matrices. DES as extraction solvents in the separation of aromatic hydrocarbons from naphtha was also studied and promising results were published in 2012 and 2013.

They were also studied for their applicability in the production and purification of biodiesel, and their ability to extract metals for analysis.  Incorporating microwave heating with deep eutectic solvent can efficiently increase the solubility power of DES and reduce the time required for complete dissolution of biological samples at atmospheric pressure. It is noteworthy that proton-conducting DES (e.g. the mixture of imidazolium methanesulfonate and 1H-1,2,4-triazole in a 1:3 mole ratio or the mixture of 1,2,4-triazolium methanesulfonate and 1H-1,2,4-triazole in a 1:3 mole ratio, wherein the Brønsted base may act as the hydrogen bond donor) have also found applications as proton conductors for fuel cells.

Owing to their unique composition, DES are promising solvating environments, affecting the structure and self-assembly of solutes. For example, the self-assembly of sodium dodecyl sulfate (SDS) in DES has recently been studied, implying DES can form microemulsions different from those in water. In another case, the solvation of the polymer polyvinylpyrrolidone (PVP) in DES is distinct from water, whereby the DES appear to be a better solvent for the polymer. It has been also shown that depending on state of matter of the solute homogeneous or heterogeneous mixtures are formed.

DES have also been studied for their potential use as more environmentally sustainable solvents for extracting gold and other precious metals from ore. Some solvent extraction work has been done using DES solvents, Mark Foreman at Chalmers has in recent years published several papers on this topic. He wrote about the use of the solvents for battery recycling from an applied point of view and he also published what may be the first ever serious study of solvent extraction of metals from DES. Foreman has also published two pure research papers on the activity issues in DES, in the first he pointed out that activity coefficients in DES do appear to deviate wildly away from their values in sodium chloride solution while in his later paper he provides a mathematical model for the activity coefficients in DES using the SIT equation. Lastly, DES involvement in thermoelectrical field was researched through the incorporation of DES in thermoelectric polymer for the synthesis of improved thermoelectric polymer films.

References 

Solvents
Ionic liquids